Holmes Rock is rising to  north of Greenwich Island and west of Aitcho group in the South Shetland Islands, Antarctica.  The area was visited by early 19th century sealers.

The feature is named after Captain Jeremiah Holmes, Master of the American sealing vessel Emeline that visited the South Shetlands in 1820-21 and operated from nearby Clothier Harbour.

Location
It is separated from neighbouring Nikudin Rock to the west-southwest by a 150 m wide passage (British mapping in 1968, Chilean in 1971, Argentine in 1980, and Bulgarian in 2005 and 2009).

See also
 Aitcho Islands
 Composite Antarctic Gazetteer
 Greenwich Island
 List of Antarctic islands south of 60° S
 SCAR
 Territorial claims in Antarctica

Maps
 L.L. Ivanov et al. Antarctica: Livingston Island and Greenwich Island, South Shetland Islands. Scale 1:100000 topographic map. Sofia: Antarctic Place-names Commission of Bulgaria, 2005.
 L.L. Ivanov. Antarctica: Livingston Island and Greenwich, Robert, Snow and Smith Islands. Scale 1:120000 topographic map.  Troyan: Manfred Wörner Foundation, 2009.

References

External links
 SCAR Composite Antarctic Gazetteer.

Islands of the South Shetland Islands